Lead the Way is the second studio album by American rap supergroup, T.W.D.Y. It was released October 3, 2000 on Thump Records. It peaked at number 74 on the Billboard Top R&B/Hip-Hop Albums. The album was produced entirely by Ant Banks and Sonny B. It features guest performances by West Coast heavy-weights: Kurupt, Ice-T, Too Short, CJ Mac, B-Legit, MC Eiht, Luniz, King T, Dru Down and Cold 187um.
 
T.W.D.Y. is composed of Ant Banks, Dolla Will and Captain Save 'Em. Ant Banks also performs drums and keyboards on the album.

Track listing 
"Lead the Way" (featuring Too Short & Vidal Prevost) - 4:38
"X Files" (featuring B-Legit & Harm) - 4:32
"Get That Paper" (featuring Askari X & Vidal Prevost) - 4:24
"Wired Up" (featuring Yukmouth, Dru Down & CJ Mac) - 3:22
"P.I." (Interlude) - 0:50
"Shut Up" (featuring Ice-T, Kokane & Too Short) - 5:27
"Boss Bitches" (featuring Sylk-E. Fyne, Conscious Daughters & Gripsta) - 3:33
"Blue Suits & Badges" (featuring J-Dubb, Kurupt, Otis & Shug) - 4:12
"No Win Situation" (featuring King T, Casual, G-Stack & Keak Da Sneak) - 4:04
"Oh Boy" (Interlude) (featuring Ghetto Gomez) - 0:44
"Game Shooters" (featuring E-40, Mac Shawn & Too Short) - 6:15
"Never Sober" (featuring MC Eiht, Numskull, Otis & Shug) - 4:07
"In the Ghetto" (featuring WC, G-Stack, Otis & Shug) - 4:07
"Hoes & Tricks" (featuring Goldy, Kokane & Slink Capone) - 5:40
"Let It Go" (featuring DenGee, T-Pup, Baby DC & Butch Cassidy) - 4:28
"Cali 4 Ni Yey" (featuring Too Short, Vidal Prevost, Otis & Shug) - 4:33
"The Hook Up" (featuring Murder One, Smash, Kokane & Cold 187um) - 4:38
"Hater Bob" (Interlude) (featuring Ghetto Gomez & The Madd Idiot) - 1:08
"Me & Ski" (featuring E-A-Ski) - 3:04

Chart history

References

External links 
 [ Lead the Way] at Allmusic
 Lead the Way at Discogs
 Lead the Way at Tower Records

Ant Banks albums
2000 albums
Albums produced by Ant Banks
Gangsta rap albums by American artists